Rev. William Herbert Cecil Dunkerley (15 May 1860 – 21 August 1922) was an Anglican priest who was Archdeacon of Singapore from 1902–05.

Dunkerley was born in Shrewsbury, the son of Rev. Dr. William Dunkerley. He was educated at Denstone College and Pembroke College, Cambridge;  and ordained in 1886. After curacies in Toxteth Park and Sigglesthorne, he was Chaplain at Malacca and Penang before his time in Singapore. On returning to Europe, he worked at Castlemorton, Worcestershire; Bush Hill Park, Middlesex; Cannes, France; and Sevenoaks and Leybourne in Kent.
 
In 1886, he married Mary Beatrice Taylor, with whom he had six children. He died on 21 August 1922 at the Leybourne Rectory in Kent.

References

People educated at Denstone College
Alumni of Pembroke College, Cambridge
Archdeacons of Singapore
1922 deaths
1860 births
Clergy from Shrewsbury